Palestine national beach soccer team represents Palestine in international beach soccer competitions. It reached the semi-finals of the AFC Beach Soccer Championship in 2019 for the first time.

Competition records

AFC Beach Soccer Championship record

References 

Asian national beach soccer teams
B